Paul Wade  (born 20 March 1962) is an Australian retired soccer player, who is best known for his long-term role as captain of the Socceroos, Australia's national soccer team.

Club career
Born in Cheshire, England, Wade moved to Australia with his parents at age 11. By 1984, he had attained Australian citizenship and represented his adopted country for the first time, playing for Australia's "B" side against Tasmania. That same year, he made his debut in the National Soccer League with the Green Gully Cavaliers.

Wade played just one season with Green Gully before joining Brunswick Juventus the following season and helping them win the 1985 NSL Championship.

South Melbourne FC 
He played two seasons with Brunswick before joining South Melbourne FC. Wade would become a key player in the Hellas midfield and become a fan favourite known for his intense work rate and tackling.  He would spend eight seasons at the club, winning another NSL title in 1991 under the guidance of Ferenc Puskás. He would also win the NSL Cup in 1990 and a minor premiership (first overall at the end of the regular season) in 1993. Wade's performances for Hellas also led to him being named the NSL Player of the Year in 1988.

Later career 
He joined the Canberra Cosmos in 1995 for what would be his final two seasons, but was unable to help the team from the bottom of the standings in either campaign. He announced his retirement from competitive football in 1997 at the end of the NSL season.

Wade's club career was spent entirely in Australia, a rarity for players from that country who often go to Europe on the lure of a better quality of football, more passionate fan support and higher salaries. Wade played a total of 345 games in the NSL.

International career

Wade would become known as Mr Socceroo for his longevity and performances for the national side.

Wade's 84 "A" international appearances for Australia make him the second most capped player in the country's history (only Alex Tobin, with 87, had more). In total, Wade played 118 games for Australia between 1986 and 1996. He represented the Socceroos at the 1988 Summer Olympics in Seoul, South Korea and in two FIFA World Cup qualifying campaigns (1990 and 1994).

One of his most famous moments came in 1993, during qualifying for the 1994 World Cup when Australia faced Argentina. Faced with the dubious honour of marking star Diego Maradona, Wade was valiant in helping Australia stay in the two games, although they would eventually lose 2–1 on aggregate goals following a 1–0 defeat in Buenos Aires.

His final international game was on 1 November 1996 in Canberra against Tahiti in the 1996 OFC Nations Cup final, which Australia won.

International goals

After retirement
Wade's experience and popularity as an Australian international allowed for an easy transition to a career as a sports presenter. Wade has worked as a commentator and analyst with both the Seven Network and SBS. He has also appeared on cable television channels TVN and Fox Sports 1 as a soccer analyst, but currently appears on Sky News.

He also began the Paul Wade Soccer Schools program, which visits primary schools in various locations around Australia developing the game of football. They have quickly risen to become the leading football development program in the country, aiming to help kids "play like a Socceroo legend." He coached the Scots College 1st XI football team in 2009.

Paul Wade also recently attended the Cerebral Palsy Football National Championships held between NSW, Queensland and a combined team featuring players from NSW, Victoria and the ACT. This took place at the Sydney Academy of Sport. Paul Wade is known to be a big supporter of disabled sports. Following this appearance, his interest grew and as of 20 July 2007 he has been ratified as Patron of the Cerebral Palsy Sporting and Recreation Association (CPSARA) of NSW.

In 1995 Wade released his autobiography, Captain Socceroo: The Paul Wade story.

Paul has been an active and popular Patron of Victoria Police Soccer Club since 1995.

Wade has epilepsy and often makes appearances at functions dedicated to promoting awareness of the condition. He relapsed while attending a non-league training session in 2014, but made a full recovery afterwards.

In 2010 Wade provided commentary for the Age newspaper of Melbourne in the lead up to the 2010 World Cup. He replied to the opening question "Can Australia get through its group?" with "When the draw first came out and people around the world were saying [group D] is the group of death, I think they were saying it because of us."

Paul was confirmed as a 'Walking Football Ambassador' for the sport in June 2020 and has recently attended Walking Football Tournament at QUT Stadium in Brisbane, QLD on April 21, 2021, leaving everyone in awe of him sharing some of his fantastic stories and his great achievements.

Honours
With Australia:
 OFC Nations Cup: 1996
With South Melbourne:
 NSL Championship: 1990–1991
 NSL Cup: 1989–1990
 Dockerty Cup: 1988, 1989, 1991, 1993
With Brunswick Juventus:
 NSL Championship: 1985
Personal honours:
 Medal of the Order of Australia (OAM) Recipient: 1995
 FFA Hall of Champions Inductee – 2000
 NSL Player of the Year: 1988 with South Melbourne
 South Melbourne Team of the Century

External links
 Australian Honours profile
 Oz Football profile
 Paul Wade Soccer Schools

1962 births
Living people
People from Cheshire
Australian soccer players
Australia international soccer players
Australia B international soccer players
Olympic soccer players of Australia
English footballers
English emigrants to Australia
Brunswick Juventus players
South Melbourne FC players
People with epilepsy
National Soccer League (Australia) players
Association football midfielders
Footballers at the 1988 Summer Olympics
1996 OFC Nations Cup players
Australian soccer commentators